El Gringo (Bad Yankee) is a 2012 American action film directed by Eduardo Rodríguez, produced by After Dark Films, written by Jonathan Stokes, and starring Scott Adkins, Christian Slater and Yvette Yates.

Plot
Following an ambush in which he is wounded, and his undercover DEA partners are killed, The Man escapes into Mexico with a case holding two million dollars, and arrives in the dusty town of El Fronteras. He faces danger from the local sheriff and his thugs, a local drug cartel, his checkered past and his former DEA boss.

Partial cast

Production
The screenplay by Jonathan Stokes was purchased by After Dark Films in 2011 for Joel Silver to executive produce.

The film was shot in Bulgaria and Louisiana at an estimated cost of 7 million.

Release
The film was released in the United States to theatres on May 11, 2012, with an MPAA "R" rating. As part of the "After Dark Action" bundle, the film showed for one week in ten cities, and was simultaneously released for video on demand.

Reception
The film received mildly warm reviews. Variety described it as "an undeniable exercise in third-hand coolness, with nods to spaghetti Westerns and '70s drive-in actioners, El Gringo is diverting enough", continuing, "willfully over-the-top action and character types are fun if never quite as giddily distinctive as hoped for." The Los Angeles Times summarized, "not bad exactly, but it's not especially notable either." IndieWire noted that the film's "colorful character[s] [...] don't really get much to do to emphasize their identities amidst the action", adding, "El Gringo gets bogged down in overly-plotty nonsense, but the fight choreography and shootouts are fast-paced and inventive, allowing the film to come alive in spite of its time-wasting peripherals", giving the film a "B−".

References

External links
 
 
 Interview with Eduardo Rodriguez  at TheActionElite.com
 

2012 action films
2012 films
2012 independent films
American action films
American independent films
Films about Mexican drug cartels
Films set in Mexico
Films shot in Bulgaria
Films shot in Louisiana
Silver Pictures films
2010s English-language films
2010s American films
2010s Mexican films